Football Club Nur-Batken is a Kyrgyzstani football club based in Batken, Kyrgyzstan that plays in the Kyrgyz Premier League - the top division of Kyrgyz football. The club was founded in 2018, and plays at Zentralny Stadion.

History
The club was founded in 2018, and was officially registered with the Ministry of Justice on 29 April, 2019.

They made their domestic debut in the 2019 Keurgeuz Birinchi Ligaseu, the second division of Kyrgyz football, where they finished 4th out of 10 teams. In the same year, they came 2nd in the Ferghana Akimi Cup. Following, the cancellation of the 2020 season due to COVID-19, the team won the Keurgeuz Birinchi Ligaseu in 2021, leading to their promotion to the Kyrgyz Premier League in 2022.

Honours
 Ferghana Akimi Cup
Winners (1): 2019

Players

Current squad

References

External links
Profile at Soccerway

Football clubs in Kyrgyzstan
Association football clubs established in 2018